The New York City mayoral election of 1941 took place on November 4, 1941, in New York City. The candidates were incumbent Mayor Fiorello La Guardia, a Republican, and King County District Attorney William O'Dwyer, a Democrat, as well as other, third-party candidates. La Guardia was also the nominee of the American Labor Party, and additionally ran on the City Fusion and City ballot lines.

La Guardia won the contest with 52.35% of the vote.

See also
Mayoralty of Fiorello La Guardia

References

Mayoral election
Mayoral elections in New York City
New York City mayoral
New York City
New York City mayoral election